Datuk Jason Teoh Sew Hock is a Malaysian politician. He is a member of Malaysian Chinese Association (MCA), a major component party of Barisan Nasional (BN) coalition.

Career
Jason Teoh Sew Hock is the Chairman for MCA Iskandar Puteri division.

At GE13 in 2013, MCA division chief Jason Teoh was prepared to help BN retain the Gelang Patah seat, but was forced to give way to Abdul Ghani. At GE14 in 2018, Jason Teoh nominated as Barisan Nasional candidate to regain the Iskandar Puteri seat (previously known as Gelang Patah), however defeated by Lim Kit Siang from DAP.

On 2018 MCA party election, he re-elected as chairman MCA Iskandar Puteri division.

Election results

Honours
 :
 Officer of the Order of the Defender of the Realm (KMN) (2011)
 :
 Knight Companion of the Order of the Crown of Pahang (DIMP) - Dato’ (2010)
 :
 Companion Class II of the Exalted Order of Malacca (DPSM) - Datuk (2016)

References

Living people
Malaysian people of Chinese descent
People from Johor
Year of birth missing (living people)
Malaysian people of Teochew descent
Officers of the Order of the Defender of the Realm
Malaysian Chinese Association politicians